Mongrel is a 1982 American horror film written and directed by Robert A. Burns. This is the only feature film Burns directed.

References

External links
 
 

1982 films
1982 horror films
American independent films
1980s English-language films
1980s American films